The women's trap team competition at the 2014 Asian Games in Incheon, South Korea was held on 23 September at the Gyeonggido Shooting Range.

Schedule
All times are Korea Standard Time (UTC+09:00)

Records

Results

References

ISSF Results Overview

External links
Official website

Women Shotgun T